The red-fronted coua (Coua reynaudii) is a species of cuckoo in the family Cuculidae.
It is endemic to Madagascar.

Its natural habitat is subtropical or tropical moist lowland forests.

References

red-fronted coua
red-fronted coua
Taxonomy articles created by Polbot